Kanashsky District  (Kanaş rayonĕ) is an administrative and municipal district (raion), one of the twenty-one in the Chuvash Republic, Russia. It is located in the eastern central part of the republic and borders with Tsivilsky and Krasnarmeysky Districts in the north, Urmarsky and Yantikovsky Districts in the east, Komsomolsky and Ibresinsky Districts in the south, and with Vurnarsky District in the west. Its administrative center is the town of Kanash (which is not administratively a part of the district). Population:  42,623 (2002 Census);

History
The district was established on September 5, 1927.

Administrative and municipal status
Within the framework of administrative divisions, Kanashsky District is one of the twenty-one in the republic. The town of Kanash serves as its administrative center, despite being incorporated separately as a town of republic significance—an administrative unit with the status equal to that of the districts.

As a municipal division, the district is incorporated as Kanashsky Municipal District. The town of republic significance of Kanash is incorporated separately from the district as Kanash Urban Okrug.

References

Notes

Sources

Districts of Chuvashia

